Costal surface (referring to the side near the ribs) may refer to:
 Costal surface of lung
 Costal surface of scapula